Aphasia is the inability to comprehend or formulate language.

Aphasia may also refer to:

 Aphasia (American band), a California-based alternative rock band
 Aphasia (Japanese band), a female heavy metal/hard rock band from Japan
 Jargon aphasia, a type of aphasia involving noun selection difficulty
 On Aphasia, an 1891 book by Sigmund Freud

Music
 "Aphasia", a track on the album Wings of Tomorrow by the Swedish rock band Europe
 "Aphasia", a track on the album Cardinal by the American folk rock band Pinegrove

See also
 :Category:Aphasias